The Nevada State Legislative Police serve the Nevada Legislative Counsel Bureau and Nevada Legislature in Carson City and Las Vegas.

The Legislative Police protect all legislative employees and property and those using it. The force works for the Legislature and is not a subsidiary of any other state division. It consists of full-time officers and permanent, part-time intermittent and temporary session officers. While the Legislature is in session, officers work a minimum of 120 days. All officers have extensive law enforcement backgrounds, and many are retired law enforcement officers from around the country.

External links
Official webpage

State law enforcement agencies of Nevada
Capitol police